is a Japanese professional footballer who plays as a midfielder for Avispa Fukuoka.

References

External links

2000 births
Living people
Japanese footballers
Association football midfielders
Avispa Fukuoka players
J2 League players